The 1923 Allan Cup was the Canadian senior ice hockey championship for the 1922–23 season.

Final 
2 games total goals

Toronto 6 University of Saskatchewan 1
Toronto 5 University of Saskatchewan 1

Toronto Granites beat University of Saskatchewan 11 goals to 2.

External links
Allan Cup archives 
Allan Cup website

 
Allan Cup
Allan Cup
Allan Cup 1923